Together Again/My Heart Skips a Beat, or simply Together Again, is an album by Buck Owens and his Buckaroos, released in 1964. The double-sided single "Together Again"/"My Heart Skips a Beat" reached number one on the Billboard country chart.

Reception

In his Allmusic review, critic Stephen Thomas Erlewine called the album "one of Buck Owens' strongest albums of the '60s, as well as one of his few records to stick firmly in the honky tonk camp."

Track listing

Side one
 "My Heart Skips a Beat" (Buck Owens)
 "Close Up the Honky Tonks" (Red Simpson)
 "I Don't Hear You" (Owens)
 "Save the Last Dance for Me" (Doc Pomus, Mort Shuman)
 "Over and Over Again" (Owens)
 "Truck Drivin' Man" (Terry Fell)

Side two
 "Together Again" (Owens)
 "A-11" (Hank Cochran)
 "Ain't it Amazing Gracie" (Owens, Glen Garrison)
 "Getting Used to Losing You" (Owens, Don Rich)
 "Storm of Love" (Harlan Howard, Owens)
 "Hello Trouble (Come on In)" (Orville Couch, Eddie McDuff)

Personnel
Buck Owens – guitar, vocals
Don Rich – guitar, fiddle, vocals
Willie Cantu – drums
Bob Morris – bass
Jay McDonald – pedal steel guitar
Doyle Holly – bass
Ken Presley – drums
Tom Brumley – pedal steel guitar

References

1964 albums
Buck Owens albums
Capitol Records albums
Decca Records albums

Albums recorded at Capitol Studios